Ulm University is a public university in Ulm, Baden-Württemberg, Germany. The university was founded in 1967 and focuses on natural sciences, medicine, engineering sciences, mathematics, economics and computer science. With 9,891 students (summer semester 2018), it is one of the youngest public universities in Germany. The campus of the university is located north of the city on a hill called Oberer Eselsberg, while the university hospital has additional sites across the city.

History 
The university is the youngest public university in the state of Baden-Württemberg, which boasts several old, renowned universities in Heidelberg (founded in 1386), Freiburg (1457) and Tübingen (1477). The idea was to create a university with a new approach in both research and teaching. An important concept since the foundation of the university has always been to promote interdisciplinarity. In the decades following the foundation, the spectrum of subjects has steadily been extended, and the university has grown significantly.

An important step in combining the strength of industrial and academic research was the realization of the idea of a science park around the main university campus. Research centers of companies like Daimler, BMW, Siemens and in the past also Nokia, AEG, have been established at the site, in addition to institutes of the university focusing on applied research. Among other large research projects, the university features four Collaborative Research Centers (German: Sonderforschungsbereiche), which are established on a competitive basis by the German Research Foundation (Deutsche Forschungsgemeinschaft, DFG). Third-party funding of research reached 67.5 million euros in 2009.

In 1998, Ulm University introduced an International Masters program in English: M.Sc. in Communication Technology, which is the first of its kind in Germany. Since then, this program attracts students from different countries around the world. C-Tech Program has research collaboration with many renowned Universities around the world.

It also offers other English programs, namely M.Sc. and PhD in molecular medicine, M.Sc. in advanced materials, M.Sc. in energy science and technology, M.Sc. in finance, M.Sc. in biology and M.Sc. in advanced oncology, the latter being an extra-occupational program.

In 2003, the Ulm University was involved in founding a private university in Egypt, the German University in Cairo.

Since 2007, the university has been participating in the German Universities Excellence Initiative with the newly founded International Graduate School in Molecular Medicine Ulm.

Name 

As Albert Einstein was born in Ulm in 1879, it was suggested repeatedly that the university be named after him. In November 2006, the senate of the university finally decided to rename the university. As this decision was however not confirmed by the Ministry of Science, Research and Arts of the State of Baden-Württemberg, the university was not renamed to Albert Einstein University of Ulm (German: Albert-Einstein-Universität Ulm) as of July 2007, and stayed as Ulm University. However, the street on which the main buildings of the Ulm University are located, and thus the physical address of the university, was named "Albert-Einstein-Allee" in honor of Einstein.

Campus and facilities

Academy for Science, Industry and Technology
In 2008, the academy again expanded its course programme, including a newly added programme entitled "Special Pain Therapy". This is an 80-hour course following the curriculum of the German Medical Association, which is taught in 14 themed blocks in four modules. Another 
new offer is a three-semester programme in "Commercial Mediation and Organisational Development", which consists of nine modules and follows the guidelines of the Federal Association for Mediation in Commerce and the Workplace. Within another newly integrated programme on intercultural training, the problems of intercultural communication and interaction were dealt with. The aim here is to shorten the adaptation phase in a foreign culture during a stay abroad and thereby ease integration into the new studying or working environment. In 2008, a total of 875 participants took advantage of the academy's course offerings. The most popular in terms of participant numbers was again the "Compact Seminar Emergency Medicine", followed by the course offerings from the International Center for Advanced Studies (ICAS) and the distance learning programmes in actuarial science.

The Science Park 
The University of Ulm's campus is located on a hill on the outskirts of the city of Ulm hosts a variety of public and industrial research and development centres, as well as three major hospitals – jointly referred to as the science park.

Organisation 
The university is composed of four divisions, which in German universities traditionally are called faculties, and separate institutes. The four faculties are the medical faculty, the engineering and computer science faculty, the natural science faculty and the mathematics and economics faculty. A university hospital is associated with the medical faculty.

Faculties 
The University of Ulm is divided into four faculties, each with its numerous scientific establishments, the institutes. The faculties are headed by the deans' offices, which are responsible for coordinating student services.

 Faculty of Engineering and Computer Science
Faculty of Mathematics and Economics
Faculty of Natural Sciences
 Faculty of Medicine

Academic profile

Research 
The university has defined the following areas as its research concentrations:
 Engineering and technology
 Life Sciences and medicine
 Nanomaterials and biomaterials
 Financial services

Collaborative Research Centres
Collaborative Research Centres (Sonderforschungsbereiche – SFBs) are interdisciplinary research concentrations at one or more universities, which can be funded for up to 12 years. The University of Ulm is a public institution. As a major, innovative and forward-thinking employers in the Ulm region with over 1,800 employees, the University of Ulm University offers various facilities such as central Universitäsverwaltung, communication and information center, workshop and scientific animal research center at attractive occupations. The Collaborative Research Centres are reviewed by the German Research Foundation in a three-year rotation.

Rankings 

In 2020, Times Higher Education ranks University of Ulm 140th in the world and 8th among the world's young universities.

International exchange 
The University of Ulm currently holds 101 bilateral agreements with 79 partner universities in 19 European countries. During 2008, a total of 43 students from these partner universities studied in Ulm, while 54 students from Ulm studied abroad at European partner universities under the ERASMUS programme. From overseas partners 38 students came to study at the University of Ulm for a full year and 51 students from Ulm took part in our 27 overseas exchange programmes. A particularly large number went to Canada and Australia as well as to the US. A large proportion of international students enroll in the two-year Master in Finance program that blends finance and mathematics.

Certificate Family Friendly University
The University of Ulm received the basic certificate »Family-Friendly University« on 24 November 2008 on the basis of an audit carried out by the company berufundfamilie gGmbH. The University of Ulm's executive committee signed an agreement on objectives in which the University of Ulm commits itself to further measures of making more compatible career/ studying and family. The public awarding of the
certificate was carried out by the patron, Federal Minister of Family Affairs, Dr. Ursula von der Leyen, on 17 June 2009. On 30 June 2008, the University Hospital was the first university hospital in Baden-Württemberg to receive the same certificate. By means of interim reports and another audit after three years, the institutes are required to prove that they implement their self-imposed goals – only then will the final certificate be awarded.

Partnerships and collaborations
The idea behind the "Ulm Science Park", joining university and industrial research, is implemented successfully by collaboration between the university's associated institutions and the university, the University of Applied Science, the University Hospital and industry. Application-oriented research is in the foreground. The first associated institution was founded in 1985, the Institute for Laser Technology in Medicine and Measurement Technique (ILM), as a foundation under public law.{} Other local partnerships include:
 Ulm Innovation Region
 Ulm Science Park
 IHK Ulm
 Ulm University of Applied Science
 New Ulm University of Applied Science
 Stadt Ulm/Neu-Ulm
 Ulmer Volkshochschule
 Stadtbiblothek Ulm

German University in Cairo 
Together with the University of Stuttgart, the university is a partner university of the German University in Cairo.

Notable faculty 
 Dieter Grossmann (born 1926) – professor of painting
 Erich Sackmann (born 1934) – experimental physicist 
 Franz Josef Radermacher (born 1950) – mathematician and economist
 Helmut Maier (born 1953) – mathematician
 Elisabeth Kalko (1962–2011) – tropical scientist and ecologist
 Martin Bodo Plenio (born 1968) – physicist
 Heiner Fangerau (born 1972) – historian of medicine and medical ethics

Notable alumni 
 Reiner Knizia (born 1957) – German-style board game designer
 Sarah Straub, doctorate in psychology, 2015. Musician, songwriter and pianist.

References

External links 
 (in English)

 
Buildings and structures in Ulm
Educational institutions established in 1967
1967 establishments in West Germany
Universities and colleges in Baden-Württemberg